The Home Builders Federation (HBF) is a trade association representing private sector homebuilders in England and Wales. Its members deliver around 80% of new homes built each year.

History
The HBF can trace its roots back to 1939 and the establishment of the National Association of House Builders. This became the Federation of Registered House Builders in 1946 (representing the housing element of the National Federation of Building Trades Employers, NFBTE, in whose annual reports its activities were described), and the House Builders Federation in 1970.

From 1997 to 2000 it was part of the NFBTE successor umbrella organisation, the Construction Confederation, but started to withdraw in 2000, voting in 2001 to terminate its membership by January 2003.

It changed its name to the Home Builders Federation in 2005.

Structure
HBF members include national names (e.g. Barratt Developments, Crest Nicholson) and smaller local businesses, plus Registered Social Landlords, suppliers and companies who provide professional services to the home building industry.

Activities
The HBF represents member interests on a national and regional level, addressing technical issues (e.g. regulations and standards), planning issues, and health and safety, among other areas. For example, in February 2022, it accused the UK government of not working "constructively" to resolve the post-Grenfell cladding and fire safety crisis, and of hurling "clearly not proportionate" threats against the housing industry. In July 2022, the HBF wrote to the Department for Levelling Up, Housing and Communities, unhappy about the commitments its members were being asked to make regarding remediation of unsafe cladding.

It also represents home building interests by attending meetings of the Strategic Forum for Construction.

References

External links
 HBF website

Construction industry of the United Kingdom
Construction organizations
Construction trade groups based in the United Kingdom
Industry trade groups based in England
Organisations based in the London Borough of Southwark
Organizations established in 1939
1939 establishments in England